Miss U.S. Television was a series of contests held by the DuMont Television Network and its affiliates during 1950. The contest searched for the woman "with the most outstanding talent and beauty".

The grand finals, aired September 3, 1950, featured 13 contestants, including Edie Adams, then known as Edith Adams, who performed an opera aria and won the contest. Broadcast from the Chicago Fair of 1950, a brief clip of the grand finals was shown during the WGN-TV 40th Anniversary Special in 1988.

Episode status
No copies of the local broadcasts are known to exist. The nationally aired Grand Finals episode is at the Museum of Broadcast Communications and on Internet Archive.

See also
List of programs broadcast by the DuMont Television Network
List of surviving DuMont Television Network broadcasts

References

Bibliography
David Weinstein, The Forgotten Network: DuMont and the Birth of American Television (Philadelphia: Temple University Press, 2004) 
Alex McNeil, Total Television, Fourth edition (New York: Penguin Books, 1980) 
Tim Brooks and Earle Marsh, The Complete Directory to Prime Time Network TV Shows, Third edition (New York: Ballantine Books, 1964)

External links
Kinescope of Grand Finals at the Internet Archive

1950s American television specials
DuMont Television Network original programming
1950 American television series debuts
1950 American television series endings
Black-and-white American television shows
Beauty pageants in the United States
American awards
1950 television specials